Princess Odette Maniema Krempin (October 30, 1973 – June 27, 2016) was an African entrepreneur, former honorary consul of the Democratic Republic of the Congo in Frankfurt am Main,.

Krempin grew up in the province of Maniema, until her family moved to Paris when she was eight years old. She became a tailor, studied fashion design in Paris and Marrakech, and opened a boutique in Niger at the age of 20. Krempin moved to Frankfurt am Main in 2007, and founded the Deutsch-Afrikanisches Jugendwerk, a teaching organization.

In September 2011, Krempin was appointed Chairwoman of Somima, a mining company in the Democratic Republic of the Congo.

She was the subject of various scandals involving allegations of fraud, embezzlement of donations and other financial improprieties. Doubts were also thrown upon the veracity of her business-related claims. In 2012, she declared personal bankruptcy in Germany.  For non-payment of personal invoices and failure to appear, a German criminal court sentenced her to a payment of €15,000 in 2015.

She died in Goma in the summer of 2016.

References
 Related Nigerian Fashion Styles now appreciated across the globe

1973 births
2016 deaths
Democratic Republic of the Congo fashion designers
Businesspeople from Frankfurt
People from Maniema
Democratic Republic of the Congo emigrants to Germany